Walter Price was one of the 'Four Founding Fathers' of Aston Villa Football Club and the club's first captain.

References

Year of birth missing
Year of death missing
English footballers
Aston Villa F.C. players
Association football defenders